Wednesday is a day of the week.

Wednesday may also refer to:

Film and television
 Wednesday (film), a 2007 UK film
 A Wednesday!, a 2008 Hindi film
 Wednesday (TV series), a 2022 show based on the Addams Family

Music

Album
 Wednesday (album), a 1999 album by King Creosote

Band
 Wednesday (Canadian band), a Canadian pop group active 1971–1981
 Wednesday (American band), formed 2018 in Asheville, North Carolina

Song
 "Wednesday", a 1967 song by The Royal Guardsmen, written by B. Masona
 "Wednesday", a song written by Abrim Tilman, from the 1977 Detroit Emeralds album Feel the Need
 "Wednesday", a song by Tori Amos from her 2002 album Scarlet's Walk

Other uses
 Sheffield Wednesday F.C., an English football club
 Wednesday Addams, a member of the fictional Addams Family
 Wednesday Island, Wilhelm Archipelago, Antarctica
 Wednesday Martin, American author and cultural critic
 Mr. Wednesday, a personification of Odin in the novel American Gods

See also